Temnosternus mosaicus is a species of beetle in the family Cerambycidae. It was described by Slipinski & Escalona in 2013.

References

Desmiphorini

Beetles described in 2013